Dirty Diana is an audio drama podcast produced by QCode about a woman who hosts an erotic website. A sex-positive exploration of a woman's troubled marriage, it stars Demi Moore and Claes Bang.

Production 
Demi Moore has had a long career as an actress playing sexy roles. Both MovieWeb and Los 40 noted that Demi Moore is known for her "alluringly raspy" and "ragged voice," which David G. Maciejewski attributes to her habit of smoking Red Marlboros. Demi Moore saw the podcast as an opportunity to explore sexuality and made a distinction between the podcast's sex positive message and adult entertainment or pornography. According to MDZ Online the podcast is a feminist podcast. Shana Feste is the director of the podcast. The podcast was created entirely over Zoom due to the COVID-19 pandemic. Demi Moore recorded the show from her bathroom.

Main cast and characters 

 Demi Moore as Diana Wood
 Claes Bang as Oliver Wood, Diana's husband
 Betsy Brandt as Susan, Diana's therapist
 Mackenzie Davis as Amanda, a stripper that Oliver sees somewhat regularly (also records a fantasy for Episode 6)
 Carmen Ejogo as Petra, an heiress client at Diana's accounting firm
 Dayo Okeniyi as James, a veteran returned from Afghanistan who fills in for Liam
 Dolly Wells as Laurenne, Diana's friend
 Penelope Ann Miller as Cassie, Diana's friend
 Jon Tenney as Allen, Diana's boss as her accounting firm
 Rhys Wakefield as Liam, Diana's assistant running the website
 Lesley Ann Warren as Jean, Diana's disavowed mother
 Max Greenfield as Doug, Diana's co-worker; and as Jake, a chance bar encounter

Cameos 

 Andrea Riseborough as Jasmine, recording as "Liz" (Episode 1)
 Lena Dunham as Lux (Episode 2)
 Melanie Griffith as Carrie (Episode 3)
 Gwendoline Christie as Evie (Episode 4)
 Rosa Salazar as Jada (Episode 5)
 Ava Grey as Erika (Episode 6)
 Chris Diamantopoulos as Brady, a real-estate client of Oliver's
 Lili Taylor as a marriage therapist for Diana and Oliver

Format 
Each episode spends about half an hour focused on a single character's erotic fantasy.

Episodes

Adaptions

Novels 
Following the success of the podcast, co-writers Jen Besser and Shana Feste signed a deal with Dial Press (US) and Harper Collins (UK) to adapt the podcast into a trilogy of novels. The trilogy of novels is set to start releasing in 2022 following Diana's marriage to Oliver.

Television 
In September 2020, Amazon announced that it won the rights to a television series adaptation. Demi Moore will return to star in the series, which also brings back writers Jen Besser and Shana Feste, who will also direct.

Reception 
The show won the 2021 Ambies award for "Best Scriptwriting".

See also 

 Sex-positive feminism
Sex-positive movement

References

External links 

 
 

2020 podcast debuts
2020 podcast endings
Audio podcasts
Feminist podcasts
Binaural podcasts